Dregs may refer to:

 Dregs (film), a 2017 Iranian film
 Sediment in wine, beer, Turkish coffee or other beverage
 "Dregs of Humanity", an episode of the It's Your Move TV series
 Audio Dregs, an independent music label
 Dixie Dregs (a.k.a. The Dregs), an American rock band
 Mass of the Fermenting Dregs, a post-rock/shoegaze trio formed in Kobe, Japan in 2002

See also
 D'regs, a nomadic and warlike people who inhabit the desert regions of hubward Klatch in the Discworld series